The Scribe is the official school newspaper for the University of Colorado Colorado Springs campus, published since 1966.

A typical issue features articles in News; Sports; Health and Recreation; Letters to and from the Editor; Opinion; Life on the Bluffs; and Culture.

Every year around April Fool's Day, The Scribe transforms into The Scribble, the satirical version of The Scribe. Satirical articles are published under pseudonyms.

In March 2020, during the COVID-19 pandemic, The Scribe stopped producing a physical newspaper and began to post new articles solely on their website.

In September 2020, The Scribe added a Health and Recreation category.

In April 2021, The Scribe began a student-run podcast called subScribe Podcast

In September 2021, The Scribe began to print a monthly newspaper in addition to their online content.

References

External links 
 The Scribe website
 UCCS homepage

Student newspapers published in Colorado
University of Colorado Colorado Springs